Prison food is the term for meals served to prisoners while incarcerated in correctional institutions. While some prisons prepare their own food, many use staff from on-site catering companies. Some prisons support the dietary requirements of specific religions, as well as vegetarianism. Prisoners will typically receive a series of standard meals per day from the prison, but in many prisons they can supplement their diets by purchasing additional foods, including snacks and desserts, at the prison commissary with money earned from working in the prison or sent by family and friends.

Around the world

North America

United States

 Typical menus are designed to be low-sugar, low-salt, and to contain a moderate amount of calories. Dietary, religious, and ethical concerns are taken into consideration to a certain extent. Supreme Court cases in 1987, Turner v. Safley and O'Lone v. Estate of Shabazz, created a test that balanced the constitutional rights of prisoners to exercise their religion freely against the rights of the prisons to punish inmates and keep the prison in order. Whether or not a prison has breached an inmate's religious dietary rights is now judged from the cases of Turner and O'Lone.  While this test is still in use, many other constitutional points come into play, and it is still a widely debated issue.

Most prison food in the United States is prepared with the blast-chill method, which allows a large number of meals to be prepared and then reheated at meal times. In the US, this technique was pioneered by the New Jersey correctional system, in January 1982.

Inmates may also purchase food at the prison commissary, such as chocolate bars, beef jerky, honey, peanut butter, bread, ramen noodles, coffee, and snack cakes.

Often, private civilian contractors are responsible for all aspects of food preparation, including  training, adherence to recipes, food safety, theft prevention, and portion control.

Jewish prisoners may be issued kosher rations.

As of October 2, 2016, federal prisons offer their inmates a vegan meal option for breakfast, lunch, and dinner.

Although there is a certain amount of self-regulation, most oversight occurs as a result of inmate litigation. Complaints against prison food have been made on the grounds of breach of Constitutional Amendments. In particular, claims of inadequate food may breach the Eighth Amendment banning cruel and unusual punishment, and denial of specific food requirements on religious grounds breach the First Amendment. It was not until 1976, during the Estelle v. Gamble case, that courts began to use the Eighth Amendment for issues involving cruel and unusual punishment against inmates; however, the issues must involve 1.) "Whether the injury was objectively, sufficiently serious," and 2.) "Whether the prison official was deliberately indifferent to the inmate's needs." This can be interpreted by different courts in various ways. For example, one court may see depriving a disobedient inmate of food as "sufficiently serious," therefore going against the Eighth Amendment, while another court may see it as an appropriate measure of punishment, therefore in line with the Eighth Amendment.

State prisons often prefer to conduct their own inspections; however, they may opt for accreditation from a nonprofit organization such as the American Correctional Association. Approximately 80% of state departments of corrections are involved with such oversight organizations.

Example of meals
An example of a meal from a state prison is as follows:
2–3 ounces of meat or meat by-product
half a cup of vegetables
three-quarters of a cup of a starch
three-quarters of a cup of salad with dressing

There is concern about the change of food preparation practices. There have been several documented examples of mass illness within prisons from the food served. There have been hunger strikes from prisoners protesting being served food that makes them ill after eating. Whistle blowers and reporters have documented mouse droppings and various violations of standards in prison kitchens. It is no longer allowed for family to bring food nor share with loved ones behind bars; rather families can transfer money for a fee to allow inmates to purchase packaged foods such as prepared noodle packages and candy from the prison store. There is thus usually no way for inmates to ever have access to fresh food. Aramark, who has provided the meals to many prisons in the USA since 2004, has been sharply criticized for lowering standards and not providing sufficient quantities of edible food.

In federal prisons, breakfasts usually consist of a danish, hot or cold cereal, and milk. The other two meals of the day include foods such as chicken, hamburgers, hot dogs, lasagna, burritos, tacos, and fish patties. Inmates only have access to milk in the mornings, and have access to water and a flavored drink for the other two meals.

Prisoners have been known to create prison "spreads", or privately prepared meals with items purchased from a prison commissary, obtained from government-mandated meals to prisoners, or obtained from a prison kitchen. Spreads can often become communal gatherings of prisoners, with the general expectation that each prisoner contributes one aspect of the meal. Prison spreads are largely a response to inadequate food quality, quantity and/or variety within the meals served by the prison itself.

Europe

United Kingdom
In jails in the late 1830s prisoners were issued a spoon, a 2-pint zinc dish for broth, and a 3-gill zinc bowl for milk. During winter, when milk was in short supply, prisoners would occasionally be provided with treacle water.

Strict rules governed the quantity of food given to prisoners. For example, a female who was not in condition for work would receive around one and a half pints of broth and six ounces of bread. A male prisoner who was in condition for work would get two pints of broth and twelve ounces of bread.

Breakfast, served at 7:30 am, would comprise 5 ounces of oatmeal porridge with 3/4 of a pint of milk. Lunch, served at 12:00 pm, consisted of soup and bread. Each pint of soup was required to contain one ounce of ox head or marrow bones, 1 1/2 ounces of barley, 1/2 ounces of green peas, 1 1/2 ounces of leeks, and various other vegetables. Supper was served at 6:00 pm, and consisted of 5 ounces of oatmeal porridge and 1/2 of a pint of milk.

Up until about 2004 (in most prisons), prison meals were prepared by prisoners under the supervision of prison employees. The move towards privatization of meal preparation and rationing resulted in numerous changes from historical practices. In some prisons e.g. HMP Norwich, the prison meals are still prepared by prisoners.

Current food
The average daily allowance per prisoner is £1.87, and can be as low as £1.20. In some cases, particularly in juvenile institutions, allowances can be as high as £3.45 per day.

The total catering expenditure by the HM Prison Service in 2004–2005 was £94 million, £43 million of which was spent on food, and £32 million was spent on catering staff. Some prisoners work in the kitchens, supervised by catering staff, and this is a popular prison job as it involves working at weekends and therefore attracts higher pay, as well as providing a chance to obtain some skills in cooking.

Meals are generally not made from seasonal produce, but instead use convenience foods such as canned goods, frozen vegetables, hamburgers and pies.

Examples of meals
Examples of menus in a London prison are as follows:

Lunch:
Vegetarian pasta bake
Chicken & mushroom pie
Jamaican beef patty
Corned beef & pickle roll
Jacket potato & coleslaw

Dinner:
Vegetable supreme
Chicken supreme
Chicken curry
Grilled gammon
Pork pie salad

Africa

Egypt
Regular meals served to prisoners are basic. For lunch prisoners are typically served dishes such as cold pieces of boiled meat, eggs, or skinny chicken bones, white rice, and vegetable soup, and dinner consists of foods such as ful medames (a traditional Egyptian dish of fava beans, vegetable oil, and cumin) with stale bread made from mixed flours. Each prison has a canteen where prisoners can buy additional food such as meat, vegetables, and fruits to supplement their diet. Many prisoners also have food brought to them by their families.

Rwanda
Prisoners receive two basic meals a day, a breakfast of maize or sorghum porridge and a lunch or dinner of a maize porridge called Ugali and beans. Extra food is available for purchase at the prison canteen or can be brought by visitors.

Asia

Saudi Arabia
Prisoners in Saudi Arabia are served foods such as bread and sandwiches for breakfast, chicken, mutton, and fish for lunch, and rice and vegetables for dinner. Prisoners also receive rations such as salads, milk, and juice.

South Korea
Kongbap, a dish consisting of white or brown rice cooked together with grains, peas, and beans, is a common staple in Korean prisons. Prisoners are also served dishes such as bread with tomato sauce, cheese, soup, salad, and soy milk at breakfast and bone marrow and vegetable soup, kimchi, and beansprouts at lunch. Other foods such as fruits and meats are available for purchase at prison commissaries.

Vietnam
Every prisoner is entitled to 17 kilograms of rice, 15 kilograms of vegetables, 0.7 kilograms of meat, 0.8 kilograms of fish, 0.5 kilograms of sugar, and 1 kilogram of salt per month.

List of prison foods
Last meal – In the United States, when prisoners are on death row they are entitled to one last meal of their choice, which is served to them two hours before they are executed. Studies show that most of the time death row inmates choose foods that are high in calories and fat such as french fries and hamburgers. In some US states, for example, Texas, last meals were limited to 20 dollars. However, in other states such as Florida and Indiana, last meals are limited to 40 dollars. California allows for up to 50 dollars to be spent on the last meal. Most states require that the last meal be locally available. If the meal exceeds these price limits they will either reduce the portions or make the inmate choose something else. For example, a Texas inmate who asked to be served 24 soft shell tacos was only given 4. It was also found that last meal requests reflected the inmates' nationality.
Nutraloaf – Nutraloaf is given to prisoners who misbehave. Nutraloaf usually is a blended concoction of previous days' meals.  Nutraloaf can be described as very bland and cardboard-like. However, it has all of the vitamins and nutrients that are needed to survive. The morality behind nutraloaf is a widely controversial issue. Many argue that serving nutraloaf to prisoners is unethical and goes against particular rights. However, prison staff argues that nutraloaf reduces violence tremendously.
Mystery meat – similar to bologna sausage
Porridge – a former staple in UK prisons
Ričet – a European barley, bean, vegetable and pork stew sometimes associated with prisons
Gruel

See also

Hardtack, the military ration of hard bread

References

External links
 
 
Eating Behind Bars - Ending the Hidden Punishment of Food in Prison. Report by Impact/Justice on the quality and consequences of food in the U.S. prison system.